Nonlinear functional analysis is a branch of mathematical analysis that deals with nonlinear mappings.

Topics
Its subject matter includes:

 generalizations of calculus to Banach spaces
 implicit function theorems
 fixed-point theorems (Brouwer fixed point theorem, Fixed point theorems in infinite-dimensional spaces, topological degree theory, Jordan separation theorem, Lefschetz fixed-point theorem)
 Morse theory and Lusternik–Schnirelmann category theory
 methods of complex function theory

See also
 Functional analysis

Notes